Glancey is a surname. Notable people with the surname include:

Jonathan Glancey, British architectural critic and writer
Paul Glancey, British video game producer and journalist

See also 

 Glancy

Surnames
Surnames of British Isles origin
Surnames of English origin
English-language surnames